Tease for Two is a 1965 Warner Bros. Looney Tunes directed by Robert McKimson. The short was released on August 28, 1965, and stars Daffy Duck and the Goofy Gophers in their final appearance. The voices were performed by Mel Blanc.

The cartoon marked the final theatrical appearance of the Goofy Gophers during the original Golden Age of Animation era. Unlike previous Goofy Gophers cartoons where the characters were performed by Blanc and Stan Freberg voiced the Gophers, in this cartoon Blanc performs both parts.

The title is a play on the phrase "tea for two."

Plot
The map of fortune hunter Daffy Duck indicates that gold is located at precisely the spot where the Goofy Gophers live. When Mac and Tosh refuse to leave and defend their home, Daffy decides that violent means are needed to involuntarily remove what he considers pests. The Gophers fight back by giving Daffy first explosives, then ordinary rocks painted like gold, the latter of which fools Daffy into thinking he actually struck gold.

Crew
 Director: Robert McKimson 
 Story: David Detiege
 Animation: Warren Batchelder, Bob Matz, Manny Perez
 Layout: Dick Ung
 Backgrounds: Tom O'Loughlin
 Film Editor: Lee Gunther
 Voice Characterizations: Mel Blanc
 Music: Bill Lava
 Produced by: David H. DePatie and Friz Freleng

See also
List of American films of 1965

References

External links
 

1965 films
1965 animated films
1965 short films
Films directed by Robert McKimson
Daffy Duck films
Looney Tunes shorts
Warner Bros. Cartoons animated short films
DePatie–Freleng Enterprises short films
Films scored by William Lava
1960s Warner Bros. animated short films
1960s English-language films
Goofy Gophers films